This is a list of the extreme points of Argentina, the points that are farther north, south, east or west than any other location, and the highest and lowest points.

Latitude and longitude

Argentina 
 Northernmost point: Confluence between the Grande de San Juan River and the Mojinete River, Jujuy Province: 
 Southernmost point: Islote Blanco (near Cape San Pío), Beagle Channel, Tierra del Fuego Province:  ¹
 Westernmost point: Cerro Agasiz, Santa Cruz Province:  ²
 Easternmost point: Bernardo de Irigoyen, Misiones Province:  ³

¹ If the Argentine claims on South Georgia and the South Sandwich Islands are considered, the southernmost point is Thule Island: . If Argentine Antarctica claims are considered (in contradiction of the Antarctic Treaty) the southernmost point is at the South Pole.
² If Argentine Antarctica claims are considered (in contradiction of the Antarctic Treaty) the westernmost part is the 74ºW meridian over Antarctica.
³ If the Argentine claims on South Georgia and the South Sandwich Islands are considered, the easternmost point is Montagu Island: . sa

Argentina (mainland) 
 Northernmost point: Confluence between the Grande de San Juan River and the Mojinete River, Jujuy Province 
 Southernmost point: Punta Dúngeness, Santa Cruz Province 
 Westernmost point: Cerro Agasiz, Santa Cruz 
 Easternmost point: Bernardo de Irigoyen, Misiones Province

Altitude 

 Highest point: Aconcagua, Mendoza, 6,962 m 
 Lowest point: Laguna del Carbón, Santa Cruz, -105 m

References 

Geography of Argentina
Argentina